Gaius Julius Caesar (100–44 BC) was a Roman military and political leader and one of the most influential men of classical antiquity.

Julius Caesar may also refer to:

People
 Julius Caesar (judge) (1557/8–1636), English judge and politician
 Julius Caesar (cricketer) (1830–1878), Surrey cricketer

Surnamed
Julii Caesares, ancient Roman branch of the Julii gens
 Gaius Julius Caesar (name), the meaning of the name
 Drusus Julius Caesar (disambiguation), several members of the family name "Julius Caesar" named Drusus
 Lucius Julius Caesar (disambiguation), several members of the family name "Julius Caesar" named Lucius
 Sextus Julius Caesar (disambiguation), several members of the family name "Julius Caesar" named Sextus

Given named
 Julius Caesar Alford (1799–1863), U.S. politician
 Julius Caesar Aranzi (1529–1589), Italian anatomist
 Don Julius Caesar d'Austria (1584–1609), illegitimate son of Holy Roman Emperor Rudolf II
 Julius C. Burrows (1837–1913; born as Julius Caesar Burrows), U.S. politician
 Julius Caesar Cantelmi (1457–after 1491), Roman Catholic priest
 Julius Capaccio (1552–1631) or Julius Caesar Capaccio, learned Italian
 Julius Caesar Chappelle (1852–1904), U.S. politician
 Julius Caesar Czarnikow (1838–1909), British-German businessman
 Julius Caesar Herrera (born 1954), Filipino politician
 Julius Caesar Ibbetson (1759–1817), British painter
 Julius Caesar de Miranda (1906–1956), Surinamese politician
 Julius Caesar Scaliger (1484–1558), Italian physician
 J. C. Strauss (Julius Caesar Strauss; 1857–1924), U.S. politician
 J. C. Watts (Julius Caesar Watts Jr.; born 1957), U.S. politician

Fictional
 Fictionalized versions of the famed Julius Caesar, see Cultural depictions of Julius Caesar
 Julius Caesar (Shakespeare character), the title character in Shakespeare's play Julius Caesar
Gaius Julius Caesar (Rome character)
Gaius Julius Caesar (character of Spartacus)
Julius Caesar (Asterix), a recurring villain in the Asterix comics
Julius Caesar (Xena: Warrior Princess), a character on Xena: Warrior Princess
 Julius Caesar Dithers, employer of Dagwood Bumstead in Blondie

Music
Julius Caesar (overture), an 1851 concert overture by Robert Schumann
Julius Caesar (album), an album by Smog

Stage and screen 
 Julius Caesar (play), a 1599 play by William Shakespeare
Giulio Cesare, a 1724 Italian opera by George Frideric Handel and Nicola Francesco Haym
 Julius Caesar (1914 film), an Italian film
 Julius Caesar (1950 film), a film starring Charlton Heston
 Julius Caesar (1953 film), a film starring Marlon Brando, James Mason, and John Gielgud
 Julius Caesar (1970 film), a film starring Charlton Heston, Jason Robards, and Richard Johnson
 Julius Caesar (1979 film), a film by Herbert Wise
 Julius Caesar, a 1979 BBC Television Shakespeare production starring Richard Pasco, Charles Gray, and Keith Michell
 Julius Caesar (TV miniseries), a 2002 TV miniseries directed by Uli Edel
 Julius Caesar (2012 film), a film featuring Cyril Nri

Other uses
 Julius Caesar (Andrea Ferrucci), a 16th-century statue
 Julius Caesar (block wargame), a 2000 game by Justin Thompson and Grant Dalgliesh
 Julius Caesar (crater), an impact crater on the moon

See also
Caesarion Julius Caesar's son
General Julicaesar, a villain from the series Great Mazinger
Jules, French form of "Julius"
Cajus Julius Caesar (born 1951), German politician

Julius (disambiguation)
Caesar (disambiguation)
Cesare (disambiguation), Italian form of "Caesar"
Cesar (disambiguation), French, Spanish and Portuguese form of "Caesar"
Giulio Cesare (disambiguation), Italian form of "Julius Caesar"
Julio Cesar (disambiguation), Spanish and Portuguese form of "Julius Caesar"
Assassination of Julius Caesar (disambiguation)
The Death of Julius Caesar (disambiguation)